William John Young may refer to:
 William John Young (biochemist) (1878–1942), English biochemist
 William John Young (pastoralist) (1850–1931), Australian company chief executive and station manager
 W. J. Young (1827–1896), American lumber businessman
 Willie Young (footballer, born 1956), Scottish footballer

See also
 William Young (disambiguation)